Hanna Serhiyivna Titimets (born 5 March 1989) is a Ukrainian hurdler.

Career
She represented her country at the 2012 and 2016 Summer Olympics narrowly missing the final on both occasions. In addition, she competed at two World Championships, in 2011 and 2013. Titimets won the silver medal at the 2014 European Championships.

She was sanctioned based on irregularities in her athlete biological passport and received a 2-year ban starting on 3 April 2017. In addition, all her results between 26 June 2012 and 26 June 2014 were voided.

Competition record

References

External links

1989 births
Living people
Ukrainian female hurdlers
People from Pavlohrad
Olympic athletes of Ukraine
Athletes (track and field) at the 2012 Summer Olympics
Athletes (track and field) at the 2016 Summer Olympics
European Athletics Championships medalists
Universiade medalists in athletics (track and field)
Doping cases in athletics
Ukrainian sportspeople in doping cases
Universiade gold medalists for Ukraine
Medalists at the 2011 Summer Universiade
Medalists at the 2013 Summer Universiade
Sportspeople from Dnipropetrovsk Oblast